Boyup Brook is a town in the south-west of Western Australia,  south-southeast of Perth and  northeast of Bridgetown. The town lies on Kaniyang land within the Noongar nation.

The name Boyup is derived from the name of a nearby pool "Booyup", an Aboriginal term meaning "place of big stones" (large granite outcrops common in the area) or "place of big smoke" (from burning the many surrounding grass trees).

The town's economy is primarily agricultural. It is a Cooperative Bulk Handling receival site.

History

About 1839, John Hassell brought sheep and cattle from the eastern states of Australia via Albany, and acquired a lease of land along what would later become Scotts Brook, south of the current town site. Although he grazed this stock in the area, the leases did not become permanent, and Hassell later moved to Kendenup.

That tree is now dead, but the stump and the markings remain. The stump – now known as the Gregory Tree – has been covered for preservation.

The first permanent settlement in the area was a  lease, south of the current town site, along what became known as Scotts Brook. This lease was granted to William Scott and his wife Mary ( Keane), who arrived in 1854, having travelled from Albany. They named the property Norlup, and in about 1872 built a new house that remains to this day
(albeit with more recent extensions and renovations), and is now listed on the Heritage Council of Western Australia's register.

In 1861 James George Lee Steere, in partnership with Mr J H Monger, took up a  lease near the Blackwood River. Shortly afterwards, his wife Catherine and their baby son travelled from Bunbury to join him.

In 1871 William Forrest moved into the area, to a farm called Dwalganup.

By 1882 there were nineteen families in the area. In 1896 land was set aside for a future town and the Upper Blackwood Road Board district (which became the Shire of Boyup Brook in 1961) was created as a separate local government area.

Boyup Brook was declared a town on 9 February 1900. Milestones in the town's early history include:
 1900 – The town's first building was opened, a school, with 15 students.
 1909 – A railway line from Donnybrook reached Boyup Brook.
 1910 – The Agricultural Hall was opened.
 1911 – A permanent policeman was assigned to the town. The hotel was opened. The railway line was extended from Boyup Brook to Kojonup and Katanning.
 1912 – An official post office was established. (An unofficial post office had existed for three years prior to that.)
 1914 – Land in the town site was opened for leasing.
 1924 – The Upper Blackwood Soldiers' Memorial Hospital was opened.
  – Electricity was generated and distributed within the town site.
 1936 – The town hall was opened.

Name of the town
The town was originally gazetted as Boyup by an Executive Council minute dated 31 January 1900.

However the name Boyup Brook was in common use by the locals, the Progress Committee and the Upper Blackwood Road Board. In 1908 residents suggested that the town be renamed to Boyup Brook, to avoid confusion with the similarly named Boyanup. Lee Steere, by now the Speaker of the Assembly and member for Nelson, which included the area, strongly supported the use of the name over that of "Throssell", which had been advocated by some at the time.

The name was ultimately changed to Boyup Brook on 5 February 1909 to match the railway station that was built in 1908–1909. Even after the change, there was still confusion about the name within the government, as can be seen in the name and text of the Boyup-Kojonup Railway Act 1909, assented some 10 months after the official change of name.

Country music festival

The town hosts the Boyup Brook Country Music Festival, an annual event, held in February each year. The festival has been held since 1986 and the attendance at the event has increased from 500 at the first festival to over 13,000 in recent years. It was originally held on the town's football oval, but in 2007 the purpose-built "Music Park", with a permanent  stage and sound shell, was officially opened and the festival has been held there each year since.

Sport

Boyup Brook has many sporting teams within the community. In summer, cricket, tennis, swimming and lawn bowls are prominent, while in winter, Australian rules football, field hockey, netball and golf are played.

In cricket, Boyup Brook currently participates in the Warren Blackwood Association, having competed in the now disbanded Donnybrook Blackwood Cricket association. They have won five premierships, in 2001, 2006, 2008, 2012 and 2013.

The Boyup Roos football team participates in the Lower South West Football League. The Roos have won three premierships, in 1981, 2012 and 2022. The tennis and netball clubs run both juniors and seniors. The hockey club has their own junior club, as well as a ladies team that participates in the Bunbury competition. Golf is played during the winter weeks.

Notes

References

External links
Boyup Brook Shire
Boyup Brook Tourism Association

Towns in Western Australia
South West (Western Australia)
Grain receival points of Western Australia